The Red-Haired Woman is a 2016 novel by Turkish writer Orhan Pamuk. Alex Preston, writing in The Guardian, referred to the novel as  "deceptively simple".

The novel was translated into English by Ekin Oklap. An abridged translation was read on BBC Radio 4 in 2022.

References

2016 novels
Novels by Orhan Pamuk
Novels set in Istanbul
Cases of people who fell into a well in fiction